Jaan Kurbaan is a 2011 Bengali romantic action film directed by M B Manik. The film is  produced by Mehdi Hasan Siddiki Monir and features Shakib Khan and Apu Biswas in the lead roles. It also has Nuton, Ali Raj, Afzal Sharif, Harun Kisinger, Elias Kobra, Shiba Shanu and Misha Sawdagor in supporting roles. Jaan Kurbaan was released on Eid, 31 August 2011.

The movie was remake of 2007 Telugu film Lakshyam starring Tottempudi Gopichand & Anushka Shetty.

Cast
 Shakib Khan - Jibon Rahman
 Apu Biswas - Saathi
 Ali Raj - Raihan Rahman, an inspector of Police, oldest brother of Jibon Rahman
 Misha Sawdagor - Salman Mirza, City's biggest Mafia Don
 Shiba Shanu - Aslam Mirza, youngest brother of Salman Mirza
 Elias Kobra - Maternal uncle of Mirza brother's
 Rebeka Rouf - Saathi's mother
 Afzal Sharif - Salman Mirza's Gang
 Nuton - Police Officer, Raihan Rahman's ex-girlfriend
 Harun Kisinger - Special Appearance

Soundtrack
The music was composed by Ali Akram Shuvo.

Track listing

References

2011 films
2010s romantic action films
Bengali-language Bangladeshi films
Bangladeshi romantic action films
Films scored by Ali Akram Shuvo
2010s Bengali-language films